"B.F.A. (Best Friend's Ass)" is a song by Belgian production duo Dimitri Vegas & Like Mike featured American media personality Paris Hilton. It was released on 10 May 2019 through Smash the House. Hilton raps on the song.

Remixes
 "B.F.A. (Best Friend's Ass)" (Dimitri Vegas & Like Mike Remix) – 2:53

Music video
Kim Kardashian stars in the music video, which also features drag queen and Britney Spears impersonator, Derrick Barry and transgender influencer Nikita Dragun. Part of the filming was featured on an episode of Keeping Up with the Kardashians.

Promotion
Hilton tweeted a photo of herself and Kardashian on 3 May, captioning it "#SecretProject with @KimKardashian" and quoting a line from the song.

Charts

References

2019 singles
2019 songs
Dimitri Vegas & Like Mike songs
Paris Hilton songs